Konkurs (English: Bankruptcy) is the third full-length album by Swedish black metal band Lifelover. The limited edition version includes with a poster of the band, a Lifelover sticker and the re-release of the first demo (on pro-printed CD-r) limited to 100 copies.

Track listing

Personnel

Lifelover
 – vocals, speech, guitar, lyrics
 B – vocals, speech, guitar, piano, lyrics
 H. – guitar
 Fix – bass
 1853 – speech, lyrics

Production
 Lifelover – pictures, layout
 Gok – mastering (BBC studios)

2008 albums
Lifelover albums